Dressed in Black may refer to:

 "Dressed in Black", a 2003 episode of the second season of Degrassi: The Next Generation

Music

Albums
 Dressed in Black: A Tribute to Johnny Cash (2002)
 Dressed In Black, album by Ben Vaughn Enigma Records LP, 1990 
 Dressed in Black, album by Eric Paslay 2016

Songs
 "Dressed in Black", a song by The Shangri-Las from single "He Cried" 1966
 "Dressed in Black", a song by Depeche Mode from Black Celebration 1986	
 "Dressed in Black", a song by Sia from album 1000 Forms of Fear 2014